Boris Blacher (30 January 1975) was a German composer and librettist.

Life
Blacher was born when his parents (of German-Estonian and Russian backgrounds) were living within a Russian-speaking community in the Manchurian town of Niuzhuang (hence the use of the Julian calendar on his birth record). He spent his first years in China and in the Asian parts of Russia, and in 1919, he eventually came to live in Harbin. 

In 1922 he went to Berlin where he began to study first architecture, mathematics, and then music at the Berlin Hochschule fuer Musik. He found work arranging popular and film music. 

Two years later, he turned to music and studied composition with Friedrich Koch. 

His career was interrupted by National Socialism. He was accused of writing degenerate music and lost his teaching post at the Dresden Conservatory.

His career resumed after 1945, and he later became president of the Academy of Arts, Berlin, and is today regarded as one of the most influential music figures of his time. His students include Aribert Reimann, Isang Yun, Maki Ishii, Fritz Geißler, Giselher Klebe, Heimo Erbse, Richard Aaker Trythall, Klaus Huber, Francis Burt, Gottfried von Einem, Kalevi Aho and Richard Wernick. 

Blacher was married to the pianist . They had four children including the German actress Tatjana Blacher and the international violinist Kolja Blacher. He died in Berlin in 1975, aged 72. He was buried in an Ehrengrab in the Waldfriedhof Zehlendorf, Berlin.

Works 
List of works:

1915-17: Visions fugitives, Op. 22 (arranged 1935)
1929: Habemeajaja, chamber opera, premiered 1987
1929: Jazz-Koloraturen, Op. 1 for coloratura soprano, alto saxophone and bassoon.
1930: String Quartet No. 1, Op. 11
1931: String Trio - Three Studies on Jewish folksongs
1931: Fünf Sinnsprüche Omars des Zeltmachers, Op. 3 for mezzo-soprano and piano
1931: Konzert-Ouvertüre
1931: Two Toccatas for piano
1932: Kleine Marschmusik, Op. 2 for orchestra
1933: Orchester-Capriccio über ein Volkslied, Op. 4 for orchestra
1934: Alla Marcia for orchestra
1935: Divertimento for string orchestra
1935: Etüde for string quartet
1935: Fest im Süden, Op. 6 Danse-drama in one act by Ellen Petz
1935: Fest im Süden - Suite for orchestra
1936: Divertimento for wind orchestra, Op. 7
1937: Concertante Musik, Op. 10 for orchestra
1938: Symphony, Op. 12
1938: Dance Scenes La Vie, ballet in one act
1938: Rondo for orchestra
1939: Harlekindae, Op. 13 ballet in one act with prologue and epilogue by Jens Keith
1940: Fürstin Tarakanowa (Princess Tarakanova), Op. 19 opera in three acts
1940: Fürstin Tarakanowa, Op. 19a - Suite for orchestra
1940: String Quartet No. 2, Op. 16
1940: Flute Sonata, Op. 15
1940: Concerto for String Orchestra, Op. 20
1940: Hamlet; Symphonic Poem, Op. 17 for orchestra
1940: Two Sonatinas, Op. 14 for piano
1940-41: Cello Sonata
1941: Violin Sonata, Op. 18
1942: Sonatina for Piano Four Hands
1942: Der Großinquisitor (The Grand Inquisitor), Op.21 - Oratorio after Dostoyevsky by Leo Borchard
1943: Three Pieces for piano, Op. 23
1943: Romeo und Julia, Op. 22 chamber opera, premiered Salzburg Festival 1950
1943: Drei Psalmen for baritone & piano (Psalms 142, 141 & 121).  Arranged for chamber ensemble in 1966 by Beyer
1943: Piano Sonata No. 1, Op. 14/1
1943: Piano Sonata No. 2, Op. 14/2
1944: String Quartet No. 3, Op. 32
1944: Vier Chöre on texts by Francois Villon
1945: Partita for strings & 6 percussion, Op. 24a
1945: Concerto for Jazz Orchestra
1946: Chiarina, Op. 33 - ballet in one act by Paul Strecker
1946: , Op. 24b radio opera
1946: Divertimento for trumpet, trombone and piano, Op. 31
1946: Die Flut (The Tide), Chamber opera in one act (text by Heinz von Cramer)
1947: Piano Concerto No. 1. Op. 28
1947: Orchestral Variations on a Theme by Paganini, Op.26
1947:  (The Night Swallow), Op. 27 Zeitoper in one act
1947: Four Songs, Op. 25 for soprano and piano.  Text by Friedrich Wolf
1948: Violin Concerto, Op 29
1949: Hamlet, Op. 35 - ballet in a prologue and three scenes after Shakespeare by Tatjana Gsovsky
1949: Hamlet - Suite for orchestra
1949/52: Preußisches Märchen (A Prussian Fairytale) , ballet-opera in six scenes
1950: Ornamente, Sieben Studien über variable Metren", Op. 37 for piano
1950: Lysistrata, Op. 34 ballet in three scenes after Aristophanes
1950: Lysistrata - Suite, Op. 34a from ballet for orchestra
1950: Concerto for Clarinet, Bassoon, Horn, Trumpet and Harp, Op. 36.
1951: Piano Sonata No. 3, Op. 39
1951: Divertimento for four woodwinds, Op. 38
1951: Epitaph: In memory of Franz Kafka, (String Quartet No. 4), Op. 41
1951: Sonata for solo violin, Op. 40
1951: Dialog for flute, violin, piano and string orchesra
1951: Nebel, for voice and piano
1952: Piano Concerto No. 2 (in variable metres), Op. 42
1953: Orchester-Ornament, Op. 44
1953: Studie im Pianissimo, Op. 45 for orchestra
1953/57: , Op. 43 experimental opera in one act
1954: Two Inventions, Op. 46 for orchestra
1954: Viola Concerto, Op. 48
1954: Francesca da Rimini, Op. 47 - fragment from Dante's Divina Commedia, for soprano and solo violin
1955: Der Mohr von Venedig, Op. 50 - ballet in 6 scenes and an epilogue after Shakespeare by Erika Hanka
1955: Träume vom Tod und vom Leben, Op. 49 - Cantata after a poem by Hans Arp for tenor, choir and orchestra
1956: Orchester-Fantasie, Op. 51
1956: Hommage à Mozart - Metamorphoses on a group of Mozart themes, for orchestra
1957: Music for Cleveland, Op. 53 for orchestra
1957: Two Poems, Op. 55 for jazz quartet 
1957/64 Thirteen Ways of Looking at a Blackbird, Op. 54 for soprano and string quartet (or piano)
1958: Aprèslude, Op. 57 for voice and piano
1958: Songs of the Sea Pirate O'Rourke, Op. 56 for solo voices and orchestra 
1958: Requiem, Op. 58
1959: Musica giocosa, Op. 59 for orchestra
1960: Rosamunde Floris, Op. 60 - opera (libretto by Gerhart von Westerman, based on the play by Georg Kaiser)
1961: Jüdische Chronik (A Jewish Chronicle), for chorus and orchestra
1961: Variations on a theme of Muzio Clementi, Op. 61 for piano and orchestra
1962: Five Negro Spirituals, for mezzo-soprano and ensemble
1962: Multiple Raumperperspektiven: piano and electronics 
1963: Perpetuum Mobile for solo violin
1963: Konzertstück for wind quintet and strings
1963: Demeter, ballet in four scenes by Yvonne Georgi
1963: Demeter - Suite for orchestra
1963: Drei Chansons aus Shakespeare's Romeo und Juliet for voice and Piano.
1964: Cello Concerto, premiered by Siegfried Palm
1964: Zwischenfälle bei einer Notlandung (Incidents after a Crash-landing), electronic opera
1964: Skalen 2:3:4, electronic
1964/67: Four Studies for harpsichord
1965: Elektronische Impulse, electronic
1965: Octet for clarinet, bassoon, horn and strings
1965: Tristan, ballet in seven scenes by Tatjana Gsovsky
1966: Tristan - Suite for orchestra
1966: Virtuose Musik for solo violin, 10 winds, timpani, percussion and harp
1966: Plus Minus One for string quartet and jazz ensemble
1967: Spiel mit (mir), for 2 violins and recorder
1967: Ungereimtes, nach Kinderreimen komponiert for baritone/mezzo-soprano and piano
1967: String Quartet No. 5 Variationen über einen divergierenden c-moll-Dreiklang1968: Ariadne, duodrama for two speakers and electronics
1968: Collage for orchestra
1969: Anacaona, six poems by Alfred Tennyson for mixed chorus a cappella about the Indian Queen Anacaona
1969: 200 000 Taler, opera after Sholem Aleichem's story "Dos groijse Gewins"; premiered at the Deutsche Oper Berlin
1969: Vier Ornamente for violin and piano ad lib.
1970: Musik für Osaka, electronic
1970: Concerto for piccolo trumpet and string orchestra
1970: Piano Trio
1971: Clarinet Concerto
1972: Blues, Espagnola und Rumba philharmonica, for 12 solo cellos
1972: Stars and Strings, for jazz ensemble and strings
1972: Duo for flute and piano
1972: Sonata for two cellos and 11 instruments ad libitum
1973: Variationen über eine Tonleiter for solo violin
1973: Yvonne, Prinzessin von Burgund, opera in 4 acts.  Libretto based on the play by Witold Gombrowicz
1973: For Seven = 3(6+x) for soprano and jazz ensemble
1973: Vokalisen for chorus a cappella 
1973-74: Quintet for flute, oboe, violin, viola and cello
1974: 24 Preludes for Piano
1974: Poem for large orchestra (1974), dedicated to Tatjana Gsovsky
1974: Variationen über ein Thema von Tschaikowsky ("Rokoko-Variationen"), for cello and piano
1974: Pentagramm for 16 strings
1974: Poème for orchestra
1974: Prelude and Concert Aria for mezzo-soprano and orchestra
1975: Das Geheimnis des entwendeten Briefes (The Secret of the Stolen Letter), chamber opera
1975: Fragment for string quartet

Blacher wrote the libretto for Gottfried von Einem's operas Dantons Tod (1947) and Der Prozeß'' (1953).

References

External links 

 Boris Blacher page on Boosey & Hawkes website
 Boris Blacher A Centenary Sketch by Dr David C F Wright

1903 births
1975 deaths
20th-century classical composers
20th-century German composers
20th-century German male musicians
20th-century German male writers
20th-century German dramatists and playwrights
German classical composers
German male classical composers
German opera librettists
German male dramatists and playwrights
German people of Estonian descent
Ballet composers
Jazz-influenced classical composers
Academic staff of the Hochschule für Musik Carl Maria von Weber
Commanders Crosses of the Order of Merit of the Federal Republic of Germany
People from Yingkou
People of Baltic German descent
Burials at the Waldfriedhof Zehlendorf
Soviet emigrants to Germany
Expatriates from the Russian Empire in China